Chichakluy may refer to:
 Chichakluy-e Bash Qaleh
 Chichakluy-e Hajji Aqa